Robert Conn may refer to:

 Rob Conn (born 1968), Canadian former National Hockey League player 
 Robert H. Conn (1925–2020), United States Deputy Under Secretary and Assistant Secretary of the Navy 
 Robert W. Conn (born 1942), president and chief executive officer of the Kavli Foundation
 Robert Conn, expert in plasma physics and semiconductors at Jacobs School of Engineering
 Robert Conn, musician with The Pagans

See also
Robert Conny (1646–1713), English physician